Bacolod, officially the City of Bacolod, is a 1st class highly urbanized city in the region of Western Visayas, Philippines. It is the capital of the province of Negros Occidental, where it is geographically situated but governed administratively independent.

With a total of 600,783 inhabitants as of the 2020 census, it is the most populous city in Western Visayas and the second most populous city in the entire Visayas after Cebu City.

It is notable for its MassKara Festival held during the third week of October and is known for being a relatively friendly city, as it bears the nickname "The City of Smiles". The city is also famous for its local delicacies piaya, cansi, and chicken inasal.

Etymology
Bacólod, is derived from bakólod (Old Spelling: bacólod), the Old Hiligaynon (Old Ilonggo) (Old Spelling: Ylongo and Ilongo) word for a "hill, turtle, mound, rise, hillock, down, any small eminence or elevation", since the resettlement was founded on a stony, hilly area, now the barangay of Granada. It was officially called Ciudad de Bacólod (City of Bacolod) when Municipalidad de Bacólod (Municipality of Bacolod) was converted into a city in 1938.

History

Spanish colonial period
Historical church accounts provide a glimpse of the early years of Bacolod as a mere small settlement by the riverbank known as Magsungay (translated as "horn-shaped" in English). When the neighboring settlement of Bago was elevated into the status of a small town in 1575, it had several religious dependencies and one of which was the village of Magsungay. The early missionaries placed the village under the care and protection of Saint Sebastian sometime in the middle of the 18th century.  A corregidor by the name of Luis Fernando de Luna, donated a relic of the saint for the growing mission, and since then, the village came to be known as San Sebastián de Magsung̃ay.

Bacolod was not established as a town until 1755 or 1756, after the inhabitants of the coastal settlement of San Sebastián de Magsung̃ay, were attacked by forces under Datu Bantílan of Sulu on July 14, 1755, and the villagers transferred from the coast to a hilly area called Bacólod (which is now the barangay of Granada). Bernardino de los Santos became the first gobernadorcillo. The town of Bacolod was constituted as a parroquia in 1788 under the secular clergy, but did not have a resident priest until 1802, as the town was served by the priest from Bago, and later Binalbagan. By 1790, slave raids on Bacolod by Moro pirates had ceased.

On February 11, 1802, Fr. Eusebio Laurencio became acting parish priest of Bacolod. In September 1806, Fr. León Pedro was appointed interim parish priest and the following year became the first regular parish priest. In September 1817, Fray Julián Gonzaga from Barcelona was appointed as the parish priest. He encouraged the people to settle once again near the sea. He also encouraged migration to Bacolod and the opening of lands to agriculture and industry.

In 1846, upon the request of Romualdo Jimeno, bishop of Cebu and Negros at that time, Governor-General Narciso Clavería y Zaldúa sent to Negros a team of Recollect missionaries headed by priest Fernando Cuenca. A decree of June 20, 1848, by Gobernador General Clavería ordered the restructuring of Negros politically and religiously. The following year (1849), Negros Island Gobernadorcillo Manuel Valdevieso y Morquecho transferred the capital of the Province of Negros from Himamaylan to Bacolod and the Augustinian Recollects were asked to assume spiritual administration of Negros, which they did that same year.  Transfer of Bacolod to the Recollects, however, took place only in 1871. Fray Mauricio Ferrero became the first Augustinian Recollect parish priest of Bacolod and successor to the secular priest, Fr. Mariano Ávila. In 1863, a compulsory primary public school system was set up.

In 1889, Bacolod became the capital of Occidental Negros when the Province of Negros was politically divided into the separate provinces of Occidental Negros (Spanish: Negros Occidental) and Oriental Negros (Spanish: Negros Oriental).

Revolution and Republic of Negros

The success of the uprising in Bacolod and environs was attributed to the low morale of the local imperial Spanish detachment, due to its defeat in Panay and Luzon and to the psychological warfare waged by Generals Aniceto Lacson and Juan Araneta. In 1897, a battle in Bacolod was fought at Matab-ang River. A year later, on November 5, 1898, the Negrense Revolucionarios, armed with knives, bolos, spears, and rifle-like nipa palm stems, and pieces of sawali or amakan mounted on carts, captured the convent, presently Palacio Episcopal, where Colonel Isidro de Castro y Cisneros, well-armed cazadores and platoons of Guardias Civiles, surrendered.

On November 7, 1898, most of the revolutionary army gathered together to establish a provisional junta and to confirm the elections of Aniceto Lacson as president, Juan Araneta as war-delegate, as well as the other officials. For a brief moment, the provinces of Occidental Negros and Oriental Negros were reunited under the cantonal government of the Negrense Revolucionarios, from November 6, 1898, to the end of February 1899, making Bacolod the capital. In March 1899, the American forces led by Colonel James G. Smith occupied Bacolod, the revolutionary capital of República Cantonal de Negros. They occupied Bacolod after the invitation of the Republic of Negros which sought protectorate status for their nation under the United States.

American colonial period

The Cantonal Republic of Negros became a U.S. territory on April 30, 1901. This separated Negros Island once again, reverting Bacolod to its status as the capital of Occidental Negros.

The public school of Instituto Rizal opened its doors to students on July 1, 1902. Colegio de Nuestra Señora de la Consolación, the first private institution in the province of Negros Occidental, was established in Bacolod by the Augustinian sisters on March 11, 1919, and opened in July 1919.

A historic event took place in 1938 when Municipality of Bacolod was elevated into a city through Commonwealth Act No. 326 passed by the 1st National Assembly of the Philippines creating the City of Bacolod. Assemblyman Pedro C. Hernáez of the second district of Negros Occidental sponsored the bill. The law was passed on June 18, 1938. Bacolod was formally inaugurated as a chartered city on October 19, 1938, by virtue of Commonwealth Act No. 404,  highlighted by the visit of Commonwealth President Manuel L. Quezon. President Quezon appointed Alfredo Montelíbano, Sr. as the first city mayor of Bacolod.

Japanese occupation and allied liberation
In World War II, Bacolod was occupied by the Japanese forces on May 21, 1942. Lieutenant General Kawano "Kono" Takeshi, the Japanese commanding officer of the 77th Infantry Brigade, 102nd Division, seized the homes of Don Generoso Villanueva, a prominent sugar planter—whose home, the Daku Balay served as the "seat of power" (occupational headquarters for the Japanese Forces in Negros and all of the Central Visayan region of the Philippines) and being the tallest building of Bacolod it served as the city's watchtower—and the home of his brother-in-law, Don Mariano Ramos, the first appointed Municipal President of Bacolod. The home of Don Generoso was lived in by Lt. General Takeshi throughout the duration of the war and also served as his office and the home of Don Mariano was occupied by a Japanese Colonel serving under the command of Lt. General Takeshi. The city was liberated by joint Philippine and American forces on May 29, 1945. It took time to rebuild the city after liberation.  However, upon the orders of Lt. General Takeshi, both the homes of Villanueva and Ramos were saved from destruction by the retreating Japanese forces.

In March 1945, upon the invasion of the American and Philippine Commonwealth forces, the withdrawal of the Japanese army into the mountains and the temporary occupation of Bacolod by the combined U.S. and Philippine Commonwealth armed forces, the house of Villanueva was then occupied by Major General Rapp Brush, commander of the 40th Infantry Division, known as the "Sun Burst" Division, for approximately five months. The local Philippine military built and established the general headquarters and camp bases of the Philippine Commonwealth Army which was active from January 3, 1942, to June 30, 1946. The 7th Constabulary Regiment of the Philippine Constabulary was also active from October 28, 1944, to June 30, 1946, and was stationed in Bacolod during and after World War II.

Independent Philippines

When the country finally gained independence from the United States, the city's public markets and slaughterhouses were rebuilt during the administration of then Mayor Vicente Remitió from 1947 to 1949. In 1948, a fire razed a portion of the records section of the old city hall that consumed the rear end of the building and with it, numerous priceless documents of the city.

Bacolod was classified as a highly urbanized city. On September 27, 1984, by the provision of Section 166 and 168 of 
the Local Government Code and the DILG Memo Circular No. 83-49.

In January 1985, the original hardwood and coral structure of Palacio Episcopal was almost entirely destroyed by a fire. Among the damage of the raging fire were items of significant historical value. The reconstruction of Palacio which took more than two years, was completed in 1990.

In 2008, Bacolod topped a survey by MoneySense Magazine as the "Best Place to Live in the Philippines". The city has also been declared by the Department of Science and Technology as a "center of excellence" for information technology and business process management operations. In 2017 & 2019, Bacolod was awarded the "Top Philippine Model City" as the most livable urban center in the country by The Manila Times. In 2021, Bacolod received the "2021 Most Business-Friendly Local Government Unit (LGU) Award" under the category of highly-urbanized cities outside the National Capital Region (NCR) in the search organized by the Philippine Chamber of Commerce and Industry (PCCI). This was the second time Bacolod received such award having won the same title in 2007.

Geography

Bacolod is located on the northwestern coast of the large island of Negros. Within the island, it is bounded on the north by the city of Talisay, on the east by the town of Murcia and on the south by the city of Bago. As a coastal city, it is bounded on the west by the Guimaras Strait, serving as a natural border of northwestern Negros Island Region to the neighboring Western Visayas. The global location of Bacolod is 10 degrees, 40 minutes 40 seconds - north and 122 degrees 54 minutes 25 seconds - east with Bacolod Public Plaza as the benchmark.

It is accessible by sea through the ports of Banago; the BREDCO Port in the Reclamation Area, and the port of Pulupandan. By air, it is accessible through the Bacolod–Silay International Airport, which is approximately 13 (four is counting from the Lagoon) kilometers away from the center of the city.

Bacolod is ideally located on a level area, slightly sloping down as it extends toward the sea with an average slope of 0.9 percent for the city proper and between 3 and 5 percent for the suburbs. Bacolod has two pronounced seasons, wet and dry. The rainy (wet) season starts from May to January of the following year with heavy rains occurring during the months of August and September. The dry season starts from the month of February until the last week of April.

Climate

Barangays

Bacolod is politically subdivided into 61 barangays.

 Barangay 1 (Poblacion)
 Barangay 2 (Población)
 Barangay 3 (Población)
 Barangay 4 (Población)
 Barangay 5 (Población)
 Barangay 6 (Población)
 Barangay 7 (Población)
 Barangay 8 (Población)
 Barangay 9 (Población)
 Barangay 10 (Población)
 Barangay 11 (Población)
 Barangay 12 (Población)
 Barangay 13 (Población)
 Barangay 14 (Población)
 Barangay 15 (Población)
 Barangay 16 (Población)
 Barangay 17 (Población)
 Barangay 18 (Población)
 Barangay 19 (Población)
 Barangay 20 (Población)
 Barangay 21 (Población)
 Barangay 22 (Población)
 Barangay 23 (Población)
 Barangay 24 (Población)
 Barangay 25 (Población)
 Barangay 26 (Población)
 Barangay 27 (Población)
 Barangay 28 (Población)
 Barangay 29 (Población)
 Barangay 30 (Población)
 Barangay 31 (Población)
 Barangay 32 (Población)
 Barangay 33 (Población)
 Barangay 34 (Población)
 Barangay 35 (Población)
 Barangay 36 (Población)
 Barangay 37 (Población)
 Barangay 38 (Población)
 Barangay 39 (Población)
 Barangay 40 (Población)
 Barangay 41 (Población)
 Alangilan
 Alijis
 Banago
 Bata
 Cabug
 Estefanía
 Felisa
 Granada
 Handumanan
 Mandalagan
 Mansilingan
 Montevista
 Pahanocoy
 Punta Taytay
 Singcang-Airport
 Sum-ag
 Taculing
 Tangub
 Villamonte
 Vista Alegre

Demographics
 

As of 2020, Bacolod has a total population of 600,783, and its registered voting population is 312,816 voters (2019).

Economy

Bacolod is the Philippines' third fastest growing economy in terms of information technology (IT) and business process outsourcing (BPO) activities. The city has been recommended by the Information and Communication Technology Office of the Department of Science and Technology (DOST) and Business Processing Association of the Philippines (BPAP) as the best location in the Visayas for BPO activities.
Bacolod ranked 3rd among the top ten "Next Wave Cities" of the Philippines for the best location for BPO and offshoring according to a 2010 report of the Commission on Information and Communications Technology. In 2013, the city was declared a "center of excellence" for IT-business process management operations by the DOST, joining the ranks of Metro Manila, Metro Cebu and Clark Freeport Zone.

Among the notable BPO and KPO companies operating in the city are Concentrix, Teleperformance, TTEC, iQor, Transcom, Ubiquity Global Services, Panasiatic Solutions, Focus Direct Inc. – Bacolod, Pierre and Paul Solutions Inc., TELESYNERGY Corp. – Bacolod, Hit Rate Solutions/Next Level IT Teleservices Inc., Focusinc Group Corporation (FGC Plus), Pathcutters Philippines Inc., TeleQuest Voice Services (TQVS), ServiceFirst Call Center and BPO, Fair Trade Outsourcing, and Global Strategic Business Process Solutions.

In 2012, a  portion of the  Paglaum Sports Complex was partitioned for the construction of the provincial government-owned Negros First CyberCentre (NFCC) as an IT-BPO Outsourcing Hub with a budget of P674-million. It is located at Lacson corner Hernaez Streets and offers up to 22,000 square meters of mixed IT-BPO and commercial spaces. Its facilities are divided into three sections — Information Technology, Commercial Support Facilities, and Common IT Facilities. It was inaugurated in April 2015 in rites led by President Benigno S. Aquino III. The area was initially a residential zone and has been reclassified as a commercial zone as approved by the Comprehensive Zoning Ordinance.

Along its highways, sugarcane plantations are a typical scene. As of 2003,  of the city's  of agricultural land were still planted with sugarcane.

According to the "Philippine Cities Competitiveness Ranking Project 2005" of Asian Institute of Management (AIM), Bacolod tops the list in terms of infrastructure, ahead of such other mid-size cities like Iligan, Calamba and General Santos. The city also tops the list in terms of quality of life, ahead of such other mid-size cities like San Fernando, Baguio, Iloilo and Lipa. AIM also recognized Bacolod as one of the Top Five most competitive mid-size cities together with Batangas, Iligan, Iloilo, and San Fernando.

Sports

Football

Bacolod hosted the 2005 Southeast Asian Games Football tournament, the 2007 ASEAN Football Championship qualification, the 2010 AFC U-16 Championship qualification and the 2012 AFC Challenge Cup qualification play-off first leg was held at the Panaad Stadium where the Philippines won 2–0 over Mongolia. Likewise the city has the home football stadium of the Philippines national football team (Azkals).

The Philippines Football League side Ceres–Negros F.C. is based in the city, playing their home games at the newly renovated Panaad Stadium.

Since Bacolod is also being tagged as a "Football City" in the country, an ordinance was approved by the City Council in June 2015, setting the third week of the month of April every year as the "Bacolod City Football Festival Week".

Ceres-Negros FC is the Philippines Football League 2018 Champion.

Basketball

2008 PBA All-Star Weekend was held in the city and since then has been a regular venue of Philippine Basketball Association out-of-town games. Also, the Sandugo Unigames 2012 was hosted by the city participated by various universities around the country notably those who compete in the UAAP.

The city was also the home of the Negros Slashers of the now-defunct Metropolitan Basketball Association, playing their home games at the USLS Coliseum.

Karate
The 1996 Philippine Karatedo Federation (PKF) National Championships and the 20th PKF National Open 2007 were held in the city. Both events were hosted by La Salle Coliseum of the University of St. La Salle. The tournaments were contested by hundreds of karatekas all over the country.

Golf
There are two major golf courses in the city; the Bacolod Golf and Country Club and the Negros Occidental Golf and Country Club. The city hosted the 61st Philippine Airlines Inter-club Golf Tournament and the 2008 Philippine Amateur Golf Championship. A Golf tournament sponsored by the City Mayor is also held every Masskara.

Mixed martial arts
Bacolod is home to many mixed martial arts competitions including quarterly fights hosted by the Universal Reality Combat Championship.

Parkour
The first Parkour team in Negros, known as "Parkour Bacolod", started in late 2007.

Culture

Masskara Festival

The MassKara Festival (Hiligaynon: Pista sang Maskara, Filipino: Fiesta ng Maskara) is an annual festival held on the fourth Sunday of October in Bacolod. Dancers wear masks, which is where the festival gets its name.

Panaad sa Negros Festival

The Panaad sa Negros Festival, or just the Panaad Festival (sometimes spelled as Pana-ad), is a festival held annually during the month of April. Panaad is the Hiligaynon word for "vow" or "promise"; the festival is a form of thanksgiving to Divine Providence and commemoration of a vow in exchange for a good life.

The celebration is held at the Panaad Park, which also houses the Panaad Stadium, and is participated in by the 13 cities and 19 towns of the province. For this reason, the province dubs it the "mother" of all its festivals.

Bacolaodiat Festival
Bacolod's Chinese New year Festival. It comes from the word "Bacolod" and "Lao Diat" which means celebration.

Infrastructure

Panaad Park and Sports Complex

The Panaad Park and Sports Complex is a multi-purpose park in the city owned by the Provincial Government of Negros Occidental. Situated in the complex is the Panaad Stadium which is currently used mostly for football matches. It is the home stadium of Philippines Football League team Ceres–Negros F.C. It was used for the 2005 South East Asian Games and was the venue of the pre-qualifiers of the 2007 ASEAN Football Championship or ASEAN Cup.

The stadium has a seating capacity of 15,500, but holds around 20,000 people with standing areas. It is unofficially designated as the home stadium of the Philippines national football team. Aside from the football field, it also has a rubberized track oval, an Olympic-size swimming pool and other sports facilities.
The stadium is also the home of Panaad sa Negros Festival, a week-long celebration participated in by all cities and municipalities in the province held annually every summer. The festival is highlighted by merry-making, field demonstrations, pageant and concert at the stadium. The stadium itself features replicas of the landmarks of the 13 cities and 19 municipalities of Negros Occidental.

Bacolod Public Plaza

The Bacolod Public Plaza is one of the notable landmarks in Bacolod, the capital of Negros Occidental, which is found right in the heart of downtown area, very near to the city hall and right across the San Sebastian Cathedral.

The plaza is the celebrated place of MassKara Festival. It is a week-long festival held each year in Bacolod City every third weekend of October nearest October 19, the city's Charter Anniversary. Bacolod public plaza is the final destination of Masskara street dancing competitions which is the highlights of the celebration.

Capitol Park & Lagoon

The Capitol Park and Lagoon is a provincial park located right in the heart of Bacolod City, Negros Occidental, in the Philippines. One of the landmarks of the park is the carabao (water buffalo) being reared by a woman. This carabao is located at the northern end of the lagoon. On the southern end, there is also another carabao sculpture being pulled by a man. Locals are known to feed pop corns, pop rice, and other edible delicacies sold within the park to the fishes in the lagoon.

Negros Museum

Negros Museum is a privately owned provincial museum situated in the Negros Occidental Provincial Capitol Complex in Bacolod City, Philippines. The structure was built in 1925 as the Provincial Agriculture Building. Negros Museum Cafe serves the needs of museum goers and walk-in guests, situated in the West Annex of the museum. It includes a separate entrance, which includes an open-air and an in-house station occasionally used for small theater plays and art exhibitions. The cafe and the resident chef serves as the official caterer of the Office of the Governor and the Provincial Government of Negros Occidental for official dignitary functions

Paglaum Sports Complex

The Paglaum Sports Complex is a provincial-owned sports venue adjacent to the Negros Occidental High School established during the 1970s that hosted various football events, such as the 1991 Philippines International Cup and the football event of the 2005 Southeast Asian Games. It also hosted three editions of the Palarong Pambansa (1971, 1974, 1979). However, the stadium became unfit to host football matches following the erection of business establishments around the area. In 2012, a two-hectare portion of the four-hectare complex was partitioned for the construction of the Capitol-owned Negros First CyberCentre (NFCC) as an IT-BPO Outsourcing Hub. As of 2013, the provincial government has been proposing for a renovation of the stadium to serve as alternative venue to Panaad Park and Sports Complex, particularly for football competition. Recently, the Paglaum Sports Complex also serves as an alternative venue to the Bacolod Public Plaza for the MassKara Festival celebration.

Negros Occidental Multi-Purpose Activity Center

The Negros Occidental Multi-Purpose Activity Center (NOMPAC) is a provincial-owned multi-use gym adjacent to the Capitol Park and Lagoon. It is currently used mostly for basketball, karatedo and boxing matches. Aside from the gym, it also serves as evacuation site of the province during calamities likewise also serves as cultural facilities in many events.

BAYS Center

The Bacolod Arts & Youth Sports Center (BAYS Center) is a multi-use gym fronting the Bacolod Public Plaza. It is used mostly for basketball, karatedo and boxing matches, and was previously used in events in the city like the MassKara Festival activities and other government related activities like seminars, business and political gatherings.

The gym has a seating capacity of more than a thousand. It is officially designated as the COMELEC tally headquarters for both local and national election in the Philippines.

Bacolod Baywalk

The Bacolod Baywalk is a privately owned esplanade situated near the Bacolod Real Estate Development Corporation (BREDCO) at the city's Reclamation Area. It was first opened in 2013 and re-opened to the public in 2022.

Art District
Art District located along Lacson Street is known for its street art mural and graffiti, restaurants and nightlife.

Healthcare

Bacolod has one public tertiary teaching-learning hospital under the direct management of the Department of Health – Regional Office VI (regional hospital): the Corazon Locsin Montelibano Memorial Regional Hospital (CLMMRH). In September 2022, as per Republic Act 11564, the city government-owned Bacolod City General Hospital held its groundbreaking and is expected to be completed and operational before 2024. The Bacolod City Health Office is responsible for the implementation and planning of the health care programs provided by the city government, which also operates and supervises Health Centers in the barangays of the city. Private hospitals in Bacolod that provide tertiary care include the: Dr. Pablo O. Torre Memorial Hospital (owned and operated by The Riverside Medical Center Inc.); The Doctors' Hospital Inc.; Adventist Medical Center – Bacolod; Bacolod Queen of Mercy Hospital; South Bacolod General Hospital and Medical Center Inc., Metro Bacolod Hospital and Medical Center; and the upcoming Asia–Pacific Medical Center Bacolod Inc.

Education

Bacolod currently has 4 large universities and more than a dozen other schools specializing in various courses. Currently, as sanctioned by the Department of Education, all primary and secondary institutions in the city use the K-12 educational system.

The city alone currently hosts four of well-known educational institutions in the nation. These are: 
University of St. La Salle (1952), a LaSallian district school and the second oldest campus founded by the De La Salle Philippines congregation in the country.
University of Negros Occidental – Recoletos (1941), administered by the Order of Augustinian Recollects and the first university in the province of Negros Occidental and the city of Bacolod.
STI West Negros University (1948), founded by Baptist Protestants and later acquired by the STI Education Systems Holdings, Inc.
Carlos Hilado Memorial State University (1954), the only state university in Bacolod and a satellite campus of its main campus in nearby Talisay City

Other noteworthy educational institutions include:
Colegio San Agustin – Bacolod (1962)
La Consolacion College Bacolod (1919)
Riverside College, Inc. (1961)
John B. Lacson Colleges Foundation – Bacolod (1974)
VMA Global College (1974)
Bacolod Christian College of Negros (1954)
Bacolod City College (1997)
Our Lady of Mercy College – Bacolod (2008)
College of Arts & Sciences of Asia & the Pacific – Bacolod Campus (2016)
AMA Computer College – Bacolod Campus (2012)
ABE International Business College – Bacolod Campus (1999)
Asian College of Aeronautics – Bacolod Branch (Main Campus) (2003)
Mapúa Malayan Digital College – Learning Hub Bacolod (2022)
St. Benilde School (1987)
St. Joseph School–La Salle (1960)
St. Scholastica's Academy – Bacolod (1958)
St. John's Institute (Hua Ming) (1953)
Bacolod Tay Tung High School (1934)
Jack and Jill School/Castleson High (1963/1995)
Bacolod Trinity Christian School, Inc. (1976)

Transportation

Airports

The Bacolod–Silay Airport, located in nearby City of Silay, is 15 kilometers north-east from Bacolod. Bacolod is 1 hour by air from Manila, 30 minutes by air from Cebu, 1 hour by air from Cagayan de Oro and 1 hour and 10 minutes by air from Davao City.

Bacolod City Domestic Airport was the former airport serving the general area of Bacolod. It was one of the busiest airports in the Western Visayas region, when Bacolod and Negros Occidental were both still part of it. This airport was later replaced by the new Bacolod–Silay International Airport, located in Silay. It was classified as such by the Air Transportation Office, a body of the Department of Transportation that is responsible for the operations of all other airports in the Philippines except the major international airports. The Bacolod City Domestic Airport ceased operations on January 17, 2008, prior to the opening of the Bacolod–Silay International Airport which began operations the day after.

Ports

Banago Wharf and BREDCO Port are the vessels entry point in Bacolod. It has daily access to Iloilo, with different shipping lines such as 2GO Travel (as relaunched in 2012), Weesam Express, OceanJet, Montenegro Lines, Supercat, FastCat, and Tri-Star Mega Link.

There were also access routes previously to Puerto Princesa via Iloilo City, Cagayan de Oro, General Santos, Zamboanga City, Cotabato, Butuan via Cagayan de Oro route, Dipolog, Iligan, Ozamiz, and Surigao City via Cagayan de Oro route.

As of 2012 to present, SuperFerry and Negros Navigation was relaunched into 2GO Travel with routes from Bacolod going Manila, Iloilo and Cagayan de Oro. Bacolod is 18–23 hours from the Port of Manila, 12–15 hours from the Port of Cagayan de Oro, 2-3hrs from Dumangas Port and 1hr from the Port of Iloilo.

Land routes

Bacolod has two main roads, Lacson Street to the north and Araneta Street to the south. The streets in the downtown area are one way, making Bacolod free from traffic congestion. Recently, Bacolod City is experiencing an increase in traffic congestion due to an increase in number of vehicles.

By land-ferry, Bacolod is approximately an hour directly from Iloilo City while by land-RORO-land, Bacolod is approximately 3 hours from Iloilo City via Dumangas route. By land-ferry-land, Bacolod City is approximately 4 hours and 30 minutes from Cebu City via Toledo-San Carlos/Salvador Benedicto route while it takes approximately 6 hours by land-RORO-land via same route. By land-RORO-land, Bacolod is approximately 7 hours and 30 minutes from Cebu City via Tabuelan-Escalante, Toledo-San Carlos/Escalante and Toledo-San Carlos/Canlaon routes. Bacolod to Dumaguete via Mabinay route is approximately 6 hours while via Cadiz-San Carlos route takes approximately 8 hours, both routes going Negros Oriental.

Notable personalities

Sister cities

Bacolod has the following sister cities:

Local
Dumaguete
Iloilo City
Legazpi
Naga, Camarines Sur
Makati City, Marikina City, Parañaque City and Taguig City

International
 Andong in North Gyeongsang and Seo District in Daegu, Republic of Korea
 Darwin in Northern Territory, Australia
 Kamloops in British Columbia, Canada
 Keelung, Taiwan
 Long Beach in California, United States – However, Sister Cities International designates Bacolod and Long Beach as Friendship Cities.
 Singaraja in Bali, Indonesia

See also
Negros Occidental
Hiligaynon language
Metro Bacolod (which also includes Silay and Talisay)
Ceres–Negros F.C.

References

External links

 
 [ Philippine Standard Geographic Code]

 
Metro Bacolod
Cities in Negros Occidental
Highly urbanized cities in the Philippines
Provincial capitals of the Philippines
Port cities and towns in the Philippines
Populated places established in 1575
1575 establishments in the Philippines